Ralph Gibson (born January 16, 1939) is an American art photographer best known for his photographic books. His images often incorporate fragments with erotic and mysterious undertones, building narrative meaning through contextualization and surreal juxtaposition.

Early life and education
Gibson enlisted in the United States Navy in 1956 and became a Photographers Mate studying photography until 1960. Gibson then continued his photography studies at the San Francisco Art Institute between 1960 - 1962. He began his professional career as an assistant to Dorothea Lange from 1961 to 1962 and went on to work with Robert Frank on two films between 1967 and 1968.

Work
Gibson has maintained a lifelong fascination with books and book-making. Since the appearance in 1970 of The Somnambulist, his work has been steadily impelled towards the printed page. In 1969 Gibson moved to New York, where he formed Lustrum Press in order to exert control over the reproduction of his work. Lustrum Press also published Larry Clark's Tulsa (1971). To date he has produced over 40 monographs, current projects being State of the Axe published by Yale University Press in Fall of 2008 and Nude by Taschen (2009). His photographs are included in over one hundred and fifty museum collections around the world, and have appeared in hundreds of exhibitions. He has worked exclusively with the Leica for almost 50 years.

Asked by The New York Times for his main sources of inspiration, Gibson recommended what he considered to be five seminal works: Eugene Atget's Vision of Paris, Walker Evans's American Photographs, Henri Cartier-Bresson's Decisive Moment, Robert Frank's The Americans and Alexey Brodovitch's Ballet.

Commissioned by Italian luxury label Bottega Veneta, Gibson photographed models Raquel Zimmermann and Mathias Lauridsen on locations in Milan for the brand's fall/winter 2013 advertisements.

Gibson's Hand Through a Doorway was used on the inner sleeve of the 1979 album Unknown Pleasures by UK rock band Joy Division.

In the summer 2016, on the occasion of the opening of the Galerie Thierry Bigaignon, Gibson presented an all-new series of photographs entitled "Vertical Horizon", in a colour departure from the black-and-white images for which he is celebrated.

Publications by Gibson
 The somnambulist : photographs 1970  Part 1 of a trilogy
 Deja-Vu: Second in the Black Trilogy 1973 . Part 2 of a trilogy
 Days at Sea . 1974 Part 3 of a trilogy
 Syntax . 1983
 Tropism 1987. 
 L'Anonyme 1987. 
 L'Histoire de France 1991 . Introduction by Marguerite Duras
 Light strings : impressions of the guitar 2004 . With Andy Summers
 State of the Axe: Guitar Masters in Photographs and Words 2008  Foreword by Anne Wilkes Tucker; Preface by Les Paul
 Political Abstraction: 2015 Lustrum Press, 
 The Black Trilogy:   2017  University of Texas Press, 
 Self-Exposure:  2018 HENI, London, UK

Collections
Gibson's work is held in the following public collections:

The Phillips Collection, Washington DC

Awards

Exhibition
 Rencontres d'Arles festival presented his work in 1975, 1976, 1977, 1979, 1989 and 1994.

Personal life 
Gibson currently lives in New York with his wife, fashion designer Mary Jane Marcasiano and travels frequently to Europe and Brazil.

References

External links

 

1939 births
Living people
Photographers from California
Photographers from New York (state)